The 2018 Pocono 400 was a Monster Energy NASCAR Cup Series race held on June 3, 2018 at Pocono Raceway in Long Pond, Pennsylvania. Contested over 160 laps on the  triangular racecourse, it was the 14th race of the 2018 Monster Energy NASCAR Cup Series season.

Report

Background

The race was held at Pocono Raceway, which is a three-turn superspeedway located in Long Pond, Pennsylvania. The track hosts two annual Monster Energy NASCAR Cup Series races: the Pocono 400 and the Gander Outdoors 400, as well as one Xfinity Series and Camping World Truck Series event.  Since 2013, the track is also host to a Verizon IndyCar Series race.

Pocono Raceway is one of a very few NASCAR tracks not owned by either Speedway Motorsports, Inc. or International Speedway Corporation. It is operated by the Igdalsky siblings Brandon, Nicholas, and sister Ashley, and cousins Joseph IV and Chase Mattioli, all of whom are third-generation members of the family-owned Mattco Inc, started by Joseph II and Rose Mattioli.

Outside of the NASCAR races, the track is used throughout the year by Sports Car Club of America (SCCA) and motorcycle clubs as well as racing schools and an IndyCar race. The triangular oval also has three separate infield sections of racetrack – North Course, East Course and South Course. Each of these infield sections use a separate portion of the tri-oval to complete the track. During regular non-race weekends, multiple clubs can use the track by running on different infield sections.  Also some of the infield sections can be run in either direction, or multiple infield sections can be put together – such as running the North Course and the South Course and using the tri-oval to connect the two.

Entry list

First practice

Qualifying

Qualifying results

Final practice

Race

Stage Results

Stage 1
Laps: 50

Stage 2
Laps: 50

Final Stage Results

Stage 3
Laps: 60

Race statistics
 Lead changes: 7 among different drivers
 Cautions/Laps: 6 for 23
 Red flags: 0
 Time of race: 2 hours, 52 minutes and 0 seconds
 Average speed:

Media

Television
Fox NASCAR televised the race in the United States on FS1 for the fourth consecutive year. Mike Joy was the lap-by-lap announcer, while six-time Pocono winner, Jeff Gordon and four-time winner Darrell Waltrip were the color commentators. Jamie Little, Vince Welch and Matt Yocum reported from pit lane during the race.

Radio 
Radio coverage of the race was broadcast by Motor Racing Network (MRN) and simulcasted on Sirius XM NASCAR Radio. Joe Moore, Jeff Striegle and four-time Pocono winner Rusty Wallace announced the race in the booth while the field was racing on the front stretch. Dave Moody called the race from atop a billboard outside of turn 1 when the field was racing through turn 1 while Mike Bagley called the race from a billboard outside turn 2 when the field was racing through turn 2. Kurt Becker reported the race from a billboard outside turn 3 when the field was racing through turn 3. Alex Hayden, Winston Kelley and Steve Post reported from pit lane during the race.

Standings after the race

Drivers' Championship standings

Manufacturers' Championship standings

Note: Only the first 16 positions are included for the driver standings.
. – Driver has clinched a position in the Monster Energy NASCAR Cup Series playoffs.

References

Pocono 400
Pocono 400
Pocono 400
NASCAR races at Pocono Raceway